Amarnath Pradhan (born 11 May 1958) is an Indian politician. He was a member of the 15th  Indian Parliament, and  represented Sambalpur (Lok Sabha constituency). He has a post-graduate degree in Social Work (MSW) from Sam Higginbottom University of Agriculture, Technology and Sciences.

See also
 Sambalpur (Lok Sabha constituency)

References

People from Odisha
Odisha politicians
Biju Janata Dal politicians
India MPs 2009–2014
1958 births
Living people
Lok Sabha members from Odisha
People from Sambalpur district
Sam Higginbottom University of Agriculture, Technology and Sciences alumni
Indian National Congress politicians